Sarab-e Rahim Khan (also Romanized as Sarāb-e Raḩīm Khān; also known as Sarāb) is a village in Akhtachi-ye Mahali Rural District, Simmineh District, Bukan County, West Azerbaijan Province, Iran. At the 2006 census, its population was 728, in 139 families.

References 

Populated places in Bukan County